Zipacón is a municipality and town of Colombia in the Western Savanna Province, part of the department of Cundinamarca. Zipacón borders Anolaima, Facatativá, La Mesa and Bojacá.

Etymology 
The name Zipacón comes from Muysccubun and means "crying of the zipa".

History 
In the times before the Spanish conquest, Zipacón was inhabited by the Muisca, organised in their loose Muisca Confederation. Zipacón was the site of meditation for the zipa. The settlement was at the border with the Panche, eternal enemies of the Muisca. It was in Zipacón where the Panche invaded when the Spanish conquistadors were conquering the Bogotá savanna.

The oldest evidences for agriculture of potatoes on the Bogotá savanna has been unearthed in Zipacón and dated at 3200 years BP. The settlement was inhabited since the Herrera Period, at least since 3270 BP. Rock art has been discovered in Zipacón.

Modern Zipacón was founded on July 5, 1561, by José Antonio Rubio.

Economy 
Main economical activities of Zipacón are agriculture and livestock farming.

Gallery

References

Bibliography

External links 

Municipalities of Cundinamarca Department
Populated places established in 1561
1561 establishments in the Spanish Empire
Muisca Confederation
Muysccubun